The 2003–04 Slovenian Ice Hockey League was the 13th season of the Slovenian Hockey League. Seven teams participated in the league, and Olimpija have won the league championships.

First round

Second round

Play-offs

Final
Olimpija – Slavija (1–0, 4–0, 4–1, 4–3)

3rd place
Jesenice – Kranjska Gora (2–3, 4–3, 6–2, 4–1)

References
Season on hockeyarchives.info

1
Slovenia
Slovenian Ice Hockey League seasons